The Reformed Christian Church in Croatia (the Reformirana kršćanska kalvinska Crkva u Hrvatskoj in Croatian) became an autonomous church in 1993, following the disintegration of Yugoslavia. Croatia became an independent state. The first organising Synod was held in Retfala (Rétfalu) on January 30, 1993. The Reformed Church in Yugoslavia the predecessor denomination was founded in 1933, formerly it was part of the Reformed Church in Hungary. These are mostly Hungarian speaking congregations, which organised themselves as a church in 1551. There are a few Czech speaking and Croatian churches.

The church has 21 congregations, several preaching points and 3,000-4,000 members.

According to the statistics of the Hungarian Reformed Church it has 23 congregations and 4,000 members served by 4 female and 8 male pastors.

The church is a member of the World Communion of Reformed Churches and has relationship with the Presbyterian Church (USA), the Reformed Church in Hungary and the United Reformed Church in Great Britain.

The churches subscribe to the Apostles Creed, Athanasian Creed, Nicene Creed, Heidelberg Catechism and the Second Helvetic Confession.

The current Head Bishop of the church is Péter Penn.

Separations 
The Protestant Reformed Christian Church in Croatia separated from the church.

References

External links 
church website
Reformed Church in Hercegszőlős, Croatia

Reformed denominations in Europe
Protestantism in Croatia
Members of the World Communion of Reformed Churches
Christian organizations established in 1993
1993 establishments in Croatia